"Church of Noise" is a song by rock band Therapy?, released as a single on A&M Records on 2 March 1998. It is taken from the Semi-Detached album. This single reached number 29 in the UK Singles Chart.

The single was released on CD, red 7" vinyl and cassette.

Track listing

CD European version

CD UK version

7" and cassette

Personnel
Andy Cairns: vocals/guitar
Michael McKeegan: bass guitar/backing vocals
Martin McCarrick: guitar/backing vocals
Graham Hopkins: drums/backing vocals
Chris Sheldon: producer

References

1998 songs
Therapy? songs
1998 singles
A&M Records singles
Song recordings produced by Chris Sheldon
Songs written by Andy Cairns